Proud to Be Here is the thirteenth studio album by American country music artist Trace Adkins. It was released on August 2, 2011 via Show Dog-Universal Music. A deluxe edition with four additional tracks was also released, including a duet with Blake Shelton titled "If I Was a Woman."

Track listing

Personnel
Trace Adkins - lead vocals
Robert Bailey Jr. - background vocals
Kenny Beard - background vocals
Mike Brignardello - bass guitar
Jim "Moose" Brown - keyboards
Pat Buchanan - electric guitar
Jimmy Carter - bass guitar
Jon Coleman - synthesizer
Perry Coleman - background vocals
Mickey Jack Cones - background vocals
J.T. Corenflos - electric guitar
Aly Cutter - background vocals
Eric Darken - percussion
Shelly Fairchild - background vocals
Shawn Fichter - drums
Jimmy Fortune - background vocals
Mark Gillespie - acoustic guitar
Tony Harrell - Hammond B-3 organ, keyboards, piano
Aubrey Haynie - fiddle, mandolin
Wes Hightower - background vocals
Jim Hoke - harmonica
Troy Lancaster - electric guitar
Greg Morrow - drums
Russ Pahl - pedal steel guitar
Charles "Pevy" Pevahouse - acoustic guitar
Danny Rader - acoustic guitar
Rich Redmond - percussion
Paul Reissner - fiddle
Scotty Sanders - dobro, pedal steel guitar
Adam Shoenfeld - electric guitar
Lisa Torres - background vocals
Ilya Toshinsky - acoustic guitar
John Willis - acoustic guitar
Brian Wooten - electric guitar

Charts

Weekly charts

Year-end charts

Singles

References

2011 albums
Trace Adkins albums
Show Dog-Universal Music albums
Albums produced by Mark Wright (record producer)